Dharma Pala (1035–1060) was ruler of Pala Dynasty (900–1100) of Kamarupa Kingdom.

Harsha Pala's son, named Dharma Pala, left three copper plates: 
1.  Khonamukh Plates 
2.  Subhankarapataka Grant 
3. Pushpabhadra Plates 
The first and second charters were composed by the same poet since they are couched in similar language and were issued by Dharma Pala (resplendent in the grandiosity and pomposity of usual titles). 
The Khonamukh charter was issued in the first year of his reign. The donee was Bhatta Mahabahu who was son of Vishnu 
and grandson of Ummoka and sprang from a Brahmin family, belonging to the Kashyapa gotra and the Kanva sakha of the 
Yajurveda and hailing from Madhya Desa. The charter at serial 2 was issued in the third regnal year. The 
donee hails from village Krodanja in Sravasti, famous for its learned Brahmins. The said village has been identified with Karanja in Dinajpur district of Bangladesh. The name of Krodanja is elsewhere found as Krodanchi and Kolanchi, which was centre of learned Brahmins in the Kanauj region of UP and the Brahmins of this place, who settled in north Bengal appears to have given the name of their old habitation to their new habitat as in the cases of Sravasti and Tarkari. 
The introduction of the first two Prasati is exception in the sense that it has the name of its composer, Prasthanakalsa, unlike the earlier inscription in Assam, excepting the Gachtal copper plate inscription of Gopala, composed by Balabhadra. The mention of Dharmapala as "flourishing in a city called Kamarupanagar" in Aniruddha's Prasati has created controversy, for the capital of Brahma Pala line is named Hadappaka in some records and Durjaya in others. It is also accepted that Ratna Pala transferred his capital to Durjaya and Gopala restored it to Hadappaka. It is thus difficult to determine if Kamarupanagar is same as Hadappaka or it is different and new city altogether. 
Bhattacharya (1933) thinks that Dharmapala's capital has to be identified with the city that later was known as Kamatapur on the Dharla, a tributary of the Brahmaputra. Some other related facts need attention. In 1809, Buchanan 
There is a belief that Dharmapala did build a city in the western fringe of his domain. There is no satisfactory evidence to identify Dharma Pala's capital Kamarupanagar with Kamatapur, particularly as the two names have no resemblance. But tradition associated 

References

Further reading
   
 
 
 
 
 
 
 
 
 
 
 
 

Pala dynasty (Kamarupa)
1035 births
1060 deaths
11th-century Indian monarchs